Greensleeves Rhythm Album #63: Chicatita is an album in Greensleeves Records' rhythm album series.  It was released in November 2004 on CD and LP.  The album features various artists recorded over the "Chicatita" riddim produced by Lloyd "John John" James Jr. for John John Records.

Track listing
"A Di In Ting" - Sizzla & Rainbow
"Ask For What You Want" - Capleton
"Man Clown" - Assassin
"Too Much Gun Shot" - Bling Dawg
"Walk Di Walk" - Bounty Killer & Angel Doolas
"No Gal" - Vybz Kartel
"Call Di Doctor" - Beenie Man
"Hands In Di Air" - Da'Ville
"The Ride" - Elephant Man
"Singing Di Blues" - Wayne Wonder
"Dem Fi Know" - Red Square
"You Are" - Spragga Benz
"Sick A Dis" - Mad Cobra
"Wanna Be" - Ward 21
"Plant Seed" - Ninjaman
"Room" - Zaire
"Crotches Business" - Kananga
"Chicatita Rhythm" - Jammy "Jam II" James & Paul "Teetimus" Edmund

Reggae compilation albums
2004 compilation albums
Greensleeves Records albums